Sisaket is the capital of Sisaket Province, Thailand.

Sisaket, Srisaket, Sri Saket, Si Saket or Si Sa Ket may also refer to:
Sisaket Province, a province in Northeast Thailand
Sisaket F.C., an association football club
Mueang Sisaket District, the seat of the capital district 
Wat Si Saket, a Buddhist temple in Vientiane, Laos